Joseph Augustus Zarelli (January 13, 1953 – February 1957), previously known as the "Boy in the Box" and "America's Unknown Child", was an American 4-year-old boy whose naked, extensively beaten dead body was found on the side of Susquehanna Road, in Philadelphia, Pennsylvania, on February 25, 1957. Joseph appeared to have been cleaned and freshly groomed, with a recent haircut and trimmed fingernails, although he had suffered extensive physical abuse prior to his death, with multiple bruises on his body. Joseph was also severely malnourished. The body was covered with scars, some of which were surgical (most notably on his ankle, groin, and chin). Authorities believe that the cause of death was homicide by blunt force trauma.

Despite the publicity and sporadic interest throughout the years, the boy's identity remained unknown for over half a century. On November 30, 2022, the Philadelphia Police Department announced that detectives had determined the boy's identity using DNA and genealogical databases. On December 8, 2022, after more than 65 years after his body was found, the boy was publicly identified as Joseph Augustus Zarelli during a press conference held by Philadelphia Police Department.

Discovery of the body

On February 25, 1957, Zarelli's body, wrapped in a plaid blanket, was found in the woods off Susquehanna Road in Fox Chase, Philadelphia. The body was discovered by a young man who was checking his muskrat traps. Fearing that the police would confiscate his traps, he did not report what he had found. A few days later, a college student spotted a rabbit running into the underbrush. Knowing that there were animal traps in the area, he stopped his car to investigate and discovered the body. He was also reluctant to have any contact with authorities, but he did report what he had found the following day, after hearing of the disappearance of Mary Jane Barker.

The naked body was inside a cardboard box that had once contained a bassinet of the kind sold by J. C. Penney. Zarelli's hair had been recently cropped, possibly after death, as clumps of hair clung to the body. There were signs of severe malnourishment, as well as surgical scars on the ankle and groin, and an L-shaped scar under the chin.

Investigation prior to identification 

The police received the report and opened an investigation on February 26, 1957. The dead boy's fingerprints were taken, and police at first were optimistic that he would soon be identified. However, no one ever came forward with any useful information.

The case attracted considerable media attention in Philadelphia and the Delaware Valley. The Philadelphia Inquirer printed 400,000 flyers depicting the boy's likeness, which were sent out and posted across the area, and were included with every gas bill in Philadelphia. The crime scene was combed over and over again by 270 police academy recruits, who discovered a man's blue corduroy cap, a child's scarf, and a man's white handkerchief with the letter "G" in the corner; all clues that led nowhere. The police also distributed a post-mortem photograph of the boy fully dressed and in a seated position, as he may have looked in life, in the hope it might lead to a clue.

In 1998, his body was exhumed for the purpose of extracting DNA, which was obtained from a tooth. On March 21, 2016, the National Center for Missing & Exploited Children released a forensic facial reconstruction of the victim and added him into their database. The body was then exhumed yet again in 2019 to retrieve additional DNA samples.

Identification

The child was an unidentified murder victim for decades. However, on November 30, 2022, the Philadelphia Police Department announced that they had identified the child through the use of genetic testing and investigative genetic genealogy, and that they would provide a case update in the following week. Sources stated that he was the child of a prominent family in Delaware County, Pennsylvania. Authorities said that an investigation would use the new information to continue the search for suspects. On December 8, 2022, the child was publicly identified as 4-year-old Joseph Augustus Zarelli, born on January 13, 1953. Genealogists had uncovered his name more than a year earlier, in October 2021. On January 19, 2023, the names of Zarelli's parents were reported.

Investigators were finally able to identify him after a cousin uploaded DNA to a public database. Investigators subsequently encouraged that person's mother (a first cousin of Zarelli) to submit a genetic profile to GEDmatch, which she did, allowing investigators to identify his parents. A court order for the child's birth certificate was then made, which revealed the child's name and his parents' names (subsequently verified by DNA).

Theories prior to identification

The foster home

This theory concerns a foster home that was located approximately 1.5 miles (2.5 km) from the site of the body.

In 1960, Remington Bristow, an employee of the medical examiner's office who doggedly pursued the case until his death in 1993, contacted a New Jersey psychic, who told him to look for a house that matched the foster home. When the psychic was brought to the Philadelphia discovery site, she led Bristow directly to the foster home.

Upon attending an estate sale at the foster home, Bristow discovered a bassinet similar to the one sold at J. C. Penney. He also discovered blankets hanging on the clothesline that were similar to the one in which the boy's body had been wrapped when they discovered him. Bristow believed that the boy belonged to the stepdaughter of the man who ran the foster home, and that they disposed of his body so the stepdaughter would not be exposed as an unwed mother.

However, the police established that all the foster children were accounted for, and a reexamination by police investigators confirmed that the family were likely not involved.

In 1998, Philadelphia police lieutenant Tom Augustine, who was in charge of the investigation, and several members of the Vidocq Society (a group of retired policemen and profilers), interviewed the foster father and the stepdaughter (whom he had married). The foster home investigation was closed.

The woman known as Martha or "M"
Another theory was brought forward in February 2002 by a woman who identified only as Martha, or "M", who stated her parents bought the boy and murdered him. Authorities considered her story plausible but were troubled by her testimony, as she had a history of mental illness. She stated her mother and father purchased Joseph from his birth parents in the summer of 1954, after which he was subjected to physical, sexual and psychological abuse. Authorities were unable to verify her story. Neighbors who had access to Martha's house during the time period denied that there had been a young boy living there and dismissed Martha's claims as "ridiculous."

Other theories 
Forensic artist Frank Bender developed a theory that the victim may have been raised as a girl. The child's unprofessional haircut, which appeared to have been performed in haste, was the basis for the scenario, as well as the appearance of the eyebrows having been styled. In 2008 Bender released a sketch of the unidentified child with long hair, reflecting the strands found on the body.

In 2016, two writers, one from Los Angeles, California (Jim Hoffmann) and the other from New Jersey (Louis Romano), believed they had discovered a potential identity from Memphis, Tennessee, and requested that DNA be compared between the family members and the child. The lead was originally discovered by a Philadelphia man (who introduced Romano and Hoffmann to each other) and was developed and presented, with the help of Hoffmann, to the Philadelphia Police Department and the Vidocq Society in early 2013. In December 2013, Romano became aware of the lead and agreed to help the man from Philadelphia and Hoffmann to obtain the DNA from this particular family member in January 2014 – which was sent quickly to the Philadelphia Police Department. Local authorities confirmed that they would investigate the lead, but said they would need to do more research on the circumstances surrounding the link to Memphis before comparing DNA. In December 2017 Homicide Sgt. Bob Kuhlmeier confirmed that DNA taken from the Memphis man was compared to the Fox Chase boy, and there was no connection.

Burial

Joseph Augustus Zarelli was originally buried in a potter's field. In 1998, he was reburied at Ivy Hill Cemetery in Cedarbrook, Philadelphia, which donated a large plot. The coffin, headstone, and funeral service were donated by the son of the man who had buried the boy in 1957. There was significant public attendance and media coverage at the reburial. City residents keep the grave decorated with flowers and toys.

The large headstone when first installed contained the words "America's Unknown Child", which was later changed to "Heavenly Father, Bless This Unknown Boy". On January 13, 2023, which would have been Joseph's 70th birthday, a new memorial containing his full name and image was unveiled, along with the addition of his name to the existing headstone.

Homicide investigation and developments following identification
At a December 2022 press conference, Philadelphia Police Commissioner Outlaw stated that Joseph's death is "still an active homicide investigation and we still need the public's help."
Law enforcement reported at the same conference that both of Joseph's biological parents are deceased, but the child has living half-siblings.

At the same December 2022 press conference, Philadelphia law enforcement stated that Joseph had lived in the area of 61st and Market streets. "I don't know what the neighbors knew or didn't know," said the head of the Philadelphia police homicide unit, Captain Jason Smith, at the conference. "The child did live past the age of four years old, so there would have been somebody out there that would have seen this child, perhaps another family member that hasn't stepped forward, possibly a neighbor that remembers seeing that child, and remembers whatever was occurring at that particular household."

In January 2023, NBC10 Philadelphia reported that Joseph "was born to a couple that lived at 64th and Callowhill" although, the channel stated, it was "unclear if he lived there long enough for people to even notice him."

In January 2023, The Philadelphia Inquirer reported that Joseph's biological parents were Augustus J. Zarelli, known as "Gus," and Mary Elizabeth (née Abel) Plunkett, known as "Betsy."

See also
 List of murdered American children
 List of unsolved murders

References

Bibliography

External links
 

1953 births
1957 deaths
1957 in Pennsylvania
1957 murders in the United States
Burials at Ivy Hill Cemetery (Philadelphia)
Crimes in Philadelphia
Deaths by beating in the United States
Deaths by person in Pennsylvania
 
Incidents of violence against boys
Male murder victims
Murdered American children
Murder in Pennsylvania
People murdered in Pennsylvania
Unsolved murders in the United States